David Mouradian (December 12, 1951 in Yerevan, Armenia) is an Armenian philologist, writer, film critic and publicist. He is a lecturer at the Yerevan State University and the Institute of film and theater since 1986.

Biography 

David Mouradian is a graduate of the Yerevan State University, the Faculty of Philology. His work as a novelist began to be published in 1969 in the magazine for children pioneer. His first published book, I want to tell you was in 1976. From 1977 to 1999, he worked in film studio Armenfilm as a writer. He has covered television programs on cinema and arthouse which he was secretary between 1994-1996, and was re-elected in 2001.

In 2000, he participated in "Literary Express" with representatives from 40 European countries. They voyages by train, from one capital to another, to create links between the peoples of Europe through cultural and government1. He recounts this experience smuggler cultures in his book, trains and stations. He has at heart to promote contemporary Armenian culture after the 80s, still marked by the "Soviet Thaw." Armenian cinematography owes much to this man communication. His plays and short stories have been translated into German, English, Georgian, Romanian, Russian, Tajik, Ukrainian, and French.

Professor at the National Institute of Film and theater Mouradian is very involved with institutions and national organizations. Between 1999 and 2000, he became the vice president of studio Hayfilm. It carries out several activities. Between 1994-1996 and 2001-2008, he was the vice president of the Writers' Union of Armenia. Between 2008-2010, he became Vice-Minister of the Ministry of Culture before resigning. For many years, with dedication, he managed television and wrote several screenplays for short films. Currently, he is professor at the Institute of Theatre and Cinema in Yerevan. He is president of the National Academy of Armenia film, he is also a member of the International Federation of Film Critics (FIPRESCI).

He is best known for the short novel, written in 2003, Our Old Piano which served as a scenario and play and was aired on téléfilm2.

Prizes 
 In 2001, the book "Armenian Cinema / Full Catalog" (collective of writers) received the "Prize of the Guild of Russian Film Reviews» in Moscow.
 In 2003, his screenplay Our old piano in Armenia won the Prix WUA as the "Best Screenplay of the Year."
 In 2006, he was awarded the prize in Armenia "Voske Gritch" (Golden Pen).

References

Academic staff of Yerevan State University
1951 births
Living people
21st-century Armenian male writers
Armenian male novelists
20th-century Armenian novelists
21st-century Armenian novelists
20th-century male writers
21st-century male writers